Black Sea Security was a Ukrainian magazine covering security problems in the Black Sea and Caspian Region. It was published by the Nomos Center and was established on 8 February 2005. Articles were published in Ukrainian or Russian, sometimes in English with Russian translation. All articles included short summaries in English. The magazine ceased publication in 2014 when Nomos Center was closed following the annexation of Crimea by Russia. Oleksiy Bessarabov, the deputy chief editor of the magazine, was detained in 2014.

See also
 Strategy XXI Centre for Global Studies
 Nomos Center

References

External links
 

2005 establishments in Ukraine
2017 establishments in Ukraine
Magazines established in 2005
Magazines established in 2017
Maritime magazines
Multilingual magazines
Quarterly magazines
Magazines published in Ukraine
Geopolitics
Works about geopolitics